"I'll Be Your Angel" is a song by Belgian singer Kira in 2003. It was released as a single on 17 February 2003 in the United Kingdom. The single debuted at a peak position of number 9 in the UK Singles Chart.

Track listing
CD 1
"I'll Be Your Angel" (radio edit) – 2:53
"I'll Be Your Angel" (extended mix) – 5:47
"I'll Be Your Angel" (Alphazone remix) – 7:31
"I'll Be Your Angel" (Minimalistix remix) – 3:20

Charts

References

2003 singles
2003 songs